Holy Cross Convent High School & junior college is an all-girls school located in K'Villa, Thane, Maharashtra, India. It was founded in 1964 and celebrated its Golden Jubilee in 2014.

The medium of instruction is English. The school houses classes from kindergarten up to twelve. The school follows the SSC (Secondary School Certificate) pattern of examination. It is one of the premier primary and secondary educational institutions in the Greater Mumbai (Bombay) area and has a widespread alumnae network.

History
In 1839, Mother Claudine Echernier founded the Congregation of the Sisters of the Cross of Chavanod  in France with the help of Friar Peter Marie Mermier (who founded the Congregation of the Missionaries of St. Francis de Sales, known worldwide for its Salesian Convent Schools).  The Sisters of the Cross spread to India in 1886  propagating their charitable educational goals for women in Amravati and then spreading to other parts of the country - Kolkata (Calcutta) and Vishakhapatnam amongst many places. Holy Cross Convent High School in Thane was founded in 1964 and while it quickly shed its character as purely an institution of charity, a true charity school for children in need of special care was built in the 1990s for which all the students raised significant amounts of money. The school retains its mission to help the deprived, and continues to embrace and teach the values of Peace, Purity, Knowledge, Achievement.

School Uniform
The school uniform consists of a red and white checkered pinafore dress, worn with a white half-sleeved blouse. This is common for both the primary section as well as the secondary section of the school. The only difference between the two uniforms is the distinctive tie worn by the two sections. The primary section wears a red tie with two downward sloping stripes with HCCS on it in the colors of the houses the students belong to. While the secondary section wears self-colored ties (red, blue, green and yellow) based upon the house in which the student belongs to.
The Physical Education uniform of the primary section consists of a round neck T-shirt in the colour of their respective houses with the school emblem on the front, in black. This is worn with a black divider skirt. While the secondary girls wear a white blouse with the red collar and the school logo of the colour of their house they belong to with a red divider skirt.

School Motto
"Lighted to Enlighten" is the motto of the school.

House system
The school is organized into four houses, namely– Red, Blue, Green and Yellow. Each house signifies a virtue and has a certain role-model for each virtue. The Red house stands for peace and is represented by Mother Teresa, Blue for purity and is represented by Rani Laxmi Bai, Green for knowledge (honesty in the primary section) and is represented by Indira Gandhi and Yellow for achievement and is represented by Sarojini Naidu. Holy Cross girls in the primary section wear red ties with their house stripes whereas the students in the secondary section wear ties of their individual house colours as a matter of pride and distinction within the School.

Each house participates actively in various events ranging from literary to sports. Points are awarded based on the house's performance in academics and extra curricular activities such as music, dance, painting, debates, elocution etc. The Inter–House competitions generate a healthy and competitive atmosphere for the girls which encourages them to succeed.

On Annual Sports Day, each house participates in different sporting events. The drill display by the Houses is the most spectacular part of the Sports Day. The House that earns the maximum points is awarded the 'Best House of the Year Trophy'.

Each house is headed by a Captain and a vice-Captain, popularly elected by the teacher of the class.

Principals
 Sr. Gerard D'souza (1964–1965)
 Sr.Eugene Dias (1965–1969)
 Sr.Loretta Aguiar (1972–1982)
 Sr.Charlotte Bala (1982–1988)
 Sr. Alzira Furtado (1988–1990)
 Sr.Rosita Jacques (1990–1996)
 Sr.Marina Fernandes (1996–2001)
 Sr.Veronica Fernandes (2001-2008)
 Sr.Synthia Fernandes (2008-2010)
 Sr. Anita Rodriques (2010–2018)
 Sr. Jennifer Ferrao (2018-2021)
 Sr. Josephine Dias (2021-present)

Prominent Alumnae

Fashion and Films
 Kavita Lad - Marathi Films, Television & Theatre Actress 
 Amrita Arora - Former MTV VJ, Bollywood Actress
 Sonali Bendre - Indian Actress 
 Parvati Balagopalan - Movie Director/Producer/Writer
 Jasmine D’souza née Moses - Former Gladrags Mrs. India 2002, Mrs. World 1st runner-up, Fashion Model, Actress
 Poorva Gokhale - Television actress
 Malaika Arora - Former MTV VJ, Ramp Model, Bollywood Actress
 Mini - Choreographer (Nach Baliye - 2)
 Prajakta Potnis - Artist  ('Artist of the Year' award in 2005 by the National Gallery of Modern Art, Mumbai).
 Manasi Salvi - Television Actress
 Sulekha - Actress (acted in two Malayalam films)
 Deepti Agarwal - NDTV Journalist
 Shweta Gulati - TV Serial actress, Bollywood Actress
 Diana Pinto - Miss India America 2009
 Shefali Alvares - Jazz musician

Sports and Knowledge
 Madhurika Patkar - Indian Top seed Table Tennis player
 Sharda Ugra - Leading sports journalist, sports editor, India Today
 Sandhya Prabhu - National Award for Physical Fitness - 1982, Asian Games probable – 1986, Shiv Chhatrapati Award Winner in Athletics – 1986 Thane Gaurav Puraskar in 2016
 Arti Pradhan - Youngest swimmer in the world for the year 1987-88 to swim the English Channel (Arjuna Award 1988, Shiv Chattrapti Award— 1988, Maharashtra Gaurav Puraskar– 1990, Rajiv Gandhi Puraskar– 2000)
 Veena Panicker- national-level karate gold medalist
 Carina Menezes - represented India in the u-18 FIBA Asian Basketball Championship, Thailand, 2016.

References

External links
 Holy Cross Convent Special School and Career Training Centre Thane 
 Sisters of the Cross of Chavanod - The Congregation that manages the school
 Photos of School

Catholic secondary schools in India
Primary schools in India
Christian schools in Maharashtra
Girls' schools in Maharashtra
Schools in Thane district
Education in Thane
Educational institutions established in 1964
1964 establishments in Maharashtra